Jonathan Levin High School for Media and Communications was a public high school located in The Bronx, New York City. It was one of six smaller specialty high schools located on the campus of the former William H. Taft High School, which was closed in 2008 and divided into separate collocated specialty schools. It closed in June 2016.

Purpose of the Levin School
Jonathan Levin High School specialized in the development of skills used in the film industry through hands on training. The school's enrollment declined quickly due to the phase out process: 249 students as of September 2013. According to the NYC Department of Education website: “Students are introduced to the fields of photography, web design and film and will gain the skills and knowledge necessary to contribute to an institution of higher learning and/or the workforce.”

The school's motto is “We come together as one to make a difference”.

Levin School Phase Out
New York State ruled in 2013 the high school was to be phased out. No new students were admitted in September 2013. The 12th grade graduated in June 2014, the 11th grade graduated in June 2015, and the 10th grade graduated in June 2016. At that point, the school was permanently closed.

Name
Jonathan Levin High School was named for Jonathan Levin, a teacher at the former Taft High School, who was murdered by a student in 1997.

Achievements
 Received an 'A' grade in the 2007-2008 NYC School Progress Reports survey.

See also
List of high schools in New York City

References
Notes

External links
Jonathan Levin High School at New York City Department of Education
Jonathan Levin High School Facebook Site
 March 2013 New York Times article on the phase out of Jonathan Levin High School
New York State Testing and Accountability Reporting Tool (NYSTART): School report card for Jonathan Levin High School 2008–09 (PDF)

Public high schools in the Bronx